Erika Medveczky (born 19 June 1988) is a Hungarian sprint canoer who has competed since the late 2000s. She won a bronze medal in the K-2 1000 m event at the 2009 ICF Canoe Sprint World Championships in Dartmouth, which success she repeated two years later at the 2011 ICF Canoe Sprint World Championships in Szeged.

References

External links
Canoe09.ca profile

1988 births
Living people
Canoeists from Budapest
Hungarian female canoeists
ICF Canoe Sprint World Championships medalists in kayak
Canoeists at the 2015 European Games
European Games medalists in canoeing
European Games gold medalists for Hungary
Canoeists at the 2020 Summer Olympics
Olympic canoeists of Hungary
21st-century Hungarian women